The 2011 IIHF World U18 Championship Division I was hosted in two groups of six teams each between April 10 and 17, 2011. Group A was played in Riga, Latvia between April 11 and April 17, 2011. Group B was played in Maribor, Slovenia between April 10 and April 16, 2011. On March 29, 2011 Japan withdrew from the tournament due to the 2011 Japan earthquake.

Group A

All times local (EEST/UTC+3)

Group B

All times local (EEST/UTC+3)

See also
2011 IIHF World U18 Championships
2011 IIHF World U18 Championship Division II
2011 IIHF World U18 Championship Division III

References

External links 
 IIHF.com

2011 IIHF World U18 Championships
International ice hockey competitions hosted by Latvia
International ice hockey competitions hosted by Slovenia
World
IIHF World U18 Championship Division I
Latvian